Duur (Urdu: دور, literal English translation: "far") is the third album by the Pakistani pop band Strings, first released on 21 January 2000 and then re-released on 1 January 2002. Singles from the album were Duur, Anjane, and Aankhain.

The album was a result of the band's comeback into the Pakistani pop scene after a hiatus of eight years. Originally a quartet, the band decided to continue with only two of its former members. The album was poetically named ‘duur’ meaning ‘far’ in Urdu to depict their journey restarted, towards a goal that they see from afar.

Background
Strings began as a quartet led by Faisal Kapadia and Bilal Maqsood, accompanied by Rafiq Wazir Ali and Kareem Bashir Bhoy. The four disbanded in 1992 to continue their studies. While Kapadia went to Houston, Texas to continue business studies, Maqsood joined an art school and later joined an advertising agency as an art director. Upon his return from the USA, Kapadia joined Maqsood at the firm he was working at.

Maqsood had sold his guitar and thoughts of getting into music occasionally crossed his mind. It was when Maqsood composed a tune for a song humming the word duur with it that Kapadia realised they should reform the band. Both had married, both had jobs. Kapadia even had a family business. Leaving all to satisfy their passion for music was hard. Upon consultation amongst themselves and friends from the music industry, especially Rohail Hyatt of the band Vital Signs, the two re-formed the band. They tried to approach Rafiq and Kareem but they declined as they had settled well in their new lives.

Thus the band was reincarnated and Maqsood asked his good friend Jamshed Mehmood to direct a video for their first song, Duur. By mid-2000, the song hit the airwaves and became an instant hit with fans.

Track listing
All songs are written by Anwar Maqsood except those mentioned below.
All songs are composed by Bilal Maqsood.

Personnel
All information is taken from the CD.

Strings
 Faisal Kapadia: lead vocals
 Bilal Maqsood: vocals, lead guitar

Additional musicians
 Vocals: Mikail Maqsood (Duur Reprise)
 Flute: Rahat
 Guitars: Shallum Asher Xavier, Nabeel Nihal Chishty & Faraz Anwar

Production
Produced by Strings, Nizar Lalani & Shahzad Hasan
Recorded at NL Studios & Pyramid Productions, Sindh, Karachi
Mixing: Shahzad Hasan & Ehtashamulhaq
Engineer: Nizar Lalani, Ishaq & Ehtashamulhaq
Keyboards engineer: Faizi
Art direction & design: Jami & Shariq Mushir

References

External links
Strings Online - Official Website

2000 albums
Strings (band) albums
Urdu-language albums